The Farman F.190 was a utility aircraft built in France in the 1920s and 1930s. It was a high-wing, strut-braced monoplane of conventional configuration with a fully enclosed cabin and fixed, tailskid undercarriage. Popular both as a private aircraft and in the air taxi role, some 30 examples were also operated by  airlines in France and elsewhere in Europe. Fifteen of these joined Air France's fleet in 1933 from the fleets of the smaller airlines it had absorbed.

A dedicated air ambulance version was built as the F.197S (for "Sanitaire") with provision for two litters and an attendant.

In 1932, a version with a slightly enlarged cabin, revised tail fin, and four-blade propeller entered production as the Farman F.390.

Variants

Data from: Aviafrance 
F.190main production version with a  Gnome et Rhône 5Ba engine, 57 built.
F.191Powered by a  Gnome et Rhône 5Bc for long distance flying, one built for a customer in Portugal.
F.192version with a  Salmson 9Ab engine, 22 built.

F.192/1version with a  Salmson 9Aba engine, 2 built.

F.193version with a  Farman 9Ea engine, 22 built.

F.193/1version with a  Farman 9Ebr engine, one built.

F.194version with a  Hispano-Suiza 6Mb engine, 4 built.

F.195version with a  Salmson 9Ab engine, 6 built for Venezuela.

F.196version with a  Gnome & Rhône 7Kb engine, one built.

F.197version with a   Lorraine 7Me Mizar engine, 9 built.

F.197Sair ambulance version of F.197
F.198version with a  Renault 9Pa engine, 2 built.

F.199version with a  Lorraine 9Na Algol engine, 6 built.

F.390version with a  Farman 7Ear engine, 6 built.

F.391version with a  Farman 9Ecr engine, 4 built.

F.392version with a  Farman 7Ear engine, 4 built.

F.393version with a  Farman 9Ecr engine, 11 built.

Operators

Civil operators

Air Afrique
Air France
Air Orient
Air Union
CIDNA

 Aero Club of Lithuania - 1 plane (F.393), Reg. No. LY-LRK

SPELA

LARES

Aeroput

Military operators

Brazilian Air Force

Ethiopian Air Force

Portuguese Air Force

  Spanish Republic
 Spanish Republican Air Force

Venezuelan Air Force

Uruguayan Air Force

Specifications (F.190)

References

Bibliography

 
 

1920s French civil utility aircraft
F.0190
High-wing aircraft
Single-engined tractor aircraft
Aircraft first flown in 1928